Pornmongkol Srisubseang (Thai พรมงคล ศรีทรัพย์แสง), simply known as Henry (Thai อองรี) is a Thai futsal defender, and a member of  Thailand national futsal team in 2016 FIFA Futsal World Cup. He plays for 	Thai Port Futsal Club in Futsal Thailand League.

References

Pornmongkol Srisubseang
1991 births
Living people
Futsal forwards
Pornmongkol Srisubseang